Campbell's Bridge formerly spanned Unami Creek on Allentown Road in Milford Square, Bucks County, Pennsylvania. The ,  bridge was built in 1906-1907. The bridge was designed by A. Oscar Martin and built by the Dailey Construction Company. It was one of the oldest examples of reinforced concrete arch bridges in the United States.

It was placed on the National Register of Historic Places on June 22, 1988.

In October 2005 the section of road containing the bridge was closed so that the single-span bridge could be replaced. The work was scheduled to be completed by December 2005.

See also
National Register of Historic Places listings in Bucks County, Pennsylvania
List of bridges documented by the Historic American Engineering Record in Pennsylvania
List of bridges on the National Register of Historic Places in Pennsylvania

References

External links

, includes structural engineering analysis of Campbell's Bridge

Bridges completed in 1907
Road bridges on the National Register of Historic Places in Pennsylvania
Bridges in Bucks County, Pennsylvania
Historic American Engineering Record in Pennsylvania
National Register of Historic Places in Bucks County, Pennsylvania
Concrete bridges in the United States
Open-spandrel deck arch bridges in the United States
1907 establishments in Pennsylvania